Mohammad Ghazi (born December 30, 1984) is an Iranian footballer who plays as a striker for Havadar in the Persian Gulf Pro League.

Career
Ghazi joined Zob Ahan in 2009 after spending the previous two seasons at Foolad. He signed a two-year contract with Persepolis on 30 May 2012. After spending one season at Persepolis which he was almost on the bench and not a starter, he terminated his contract with the club. He joined Esteghlal with a one-year contract before the start of 2013–14 season. He extended his contract with Esteghlal for another two years on 14 June 2014.

Club career statistics

 Assist Goals

International career
He was called to the national team for World Cup 2014 qualification by coach Carlos Queiroz.

International goals 
Scores and results list Iran's goal tally first.

Honours

Club
Zob Ahan
AFC Champions League: 2010 (Runner-up)
Iran Pro League: 2009–10 (Runner-up)

Persepolis
Hazfi Cup: 2012–13 (Runner-up)

Naft Tehran
Hazfi Cup (1): 2016–17

Individual
Hazfi Cup Top scorer: 2016–17

References

1984 births
Living people
People from Tehran
Iranian footballers
Association football forwards
Zob Ahan Esfahan F.C. players
Foolad FC players
Persepolis F.C. players
Esteghlal F.C. players
Azadegan League players
Persian Gulf Pro League players
Nassaji Mazandaran players
Mes Rafsanjan players
Fajr Sepasi players
Saba players
Naft Tehran F.C. players
Shahr Khodro F.C. players
Paykan F.C. players
Havadar S.C. players